Angell Woods is an old-growth forest in Beaconsfield, Quebec, Canada. It is bordered by Quebec Autoroute 20 to the south, Quebec Autoroute 40 to the north, an industrial park in Baie-D'Urfé to the west, and a residential subdivision to the east.

The Angell Woods are the only remaining old-growth forest as well as the largest wetland on the Island of Montreal.

On March 12, 2019 the Quebec Court of Appeal rejected an appeal by Yale Properties Inc. of the decision of Aug. 7, 2017. Aug. 7, 2017, Quebec Superior Court judge Johanne Mainville ruled that Yale Properties had not been able to demonstrate that the bylaw put in place by the Beaconsfield administration had stepped over the line as to be called disguised expropriation.

Ownership
Less than half of the woods are owned by the City of Beaconsfield, the Government of Quebec and the City of Montreal, while the majority has been privately owned since the 1950s, and is currently owned by a real estate developer.

References

Beaconsfield, Quebec
Old-growth forests
Forests of Quebec
Geography of Montreal